The Republic of Korea Military Police (MP; in Korean: 군사경찰, "Gun-Sa Gyeong-Chal"), are the uniformed law enforcement agencies of each respective branch of the Republic of Korea Armed Forces. Once operated under a unified Military Police Command (헌병총사령부, "Heon-byeong Chong-sa-ryeong-bu") between 1953 and 1960, the ROK's MP units are now commanded by the Army, Navy, Marines and Air Force HQs separately. ROK Army MPs also function as a border guards at the Korean Demilitarized Zone (DMZ).

DMZ Border Guards
All ROK troops guarding and patrolling inside the DMZ wears military police armband, although they are mainly members of army's infantry or light infantry units. (Reconnaissance Battalion/Company. The ones deployed in the JSA are members of the United Nations Command Security Battalion) their equipment is that of elite ROK-army units such as body-armor/combat vests, night-vision equipment, optical sights for the Daewoo K2, etc. The reason why these soldiers are MPs is because the armistice that was signed in 1953 that ended the Korean War requires both sides (the North and the South) to restrict access inside the DMZ to MPs only, which means no vehicles, no squad-served weapons (such as mortars and HMGs) and no regular units of the army.

Equipment
The ROK MP has the following small-arms in their inventory:
 Daewoo K1A
 Daewoo K2
 Daewoo K5
 Various revolvers of U.S. origin

References

See also

 Military Police

Military of South Korea
Military provosts
Law enforcement in South Korea